Tree Hill may refer to:

Tree Hill, a fictional town in North Carolina where the One Tree Hill series is based
Tree Hill Nature Center, non-profit organization and wilderness preserve in Jacksonville, Florida
Tree Hill (Richmond, Virginia), a Greek Revival style plantation house overlooking the James River in Henrico County, Virginia

See also
One Tree Hill (New Zealand), aka Maungakiekie, volcanic peak in Auckland, New Zealand 
One Tree Hill (disambiguation)